The Honey Fox Stakes is a Grade III American Thoroughbred horse race for fillies and mares that are four years or older held over a distance of 1 mile on the turf scheduled annually in late February or early March at Gulfstream Park, Hallandale Beach, Florida. The event currently carries a purse of $150,000.

History 
The event was inaugurated on 25 May 1984 as the Honey Fox Stakes for three-year-old fillies over a distance of  miles and pitted the two divisional winners Oakbrook Lady, Delta Mary from the newly created Herecomesthebride Stakes which was held 16 days earlier. Oakbrook Lady was victorious over Delta Mary with longshot Lady Mellody a distant third in a time of 1:43 flat.

The event was named after the winning mare Honey Fox who won thirteen races in her career including the Grade II Orchid Handicap.

In 1985 Gulfstream Park introduced a new race which was a predecessor to today's named event, known as the Joe Namath Stakes which continued the conditions established in the inaugural running in 1984 with a shorter distance of one mile. This race was named after the New York Jets Super Bowl winning quarterback Joe Namath.  In 1986 the event's conditions were changed to handicap which also saw a rename to Joe Namath Handicap. Gulfstream Park acknowledges that the Honey Fox Stakes had its beginnings from the Joe Namath Handicap. 

However, the name Honey Fox was used in events and a branch continued in 1985 and with the last running in 1991. 

Between 1985 and 1989 the event was held in split divisions. 

The event was upgraded to Grade III in 1994. 

The event was renamed to the Honey Fox Handicap in 2000 and between 2013 and 2017 it was run as a Grade II race. 

In 2009, the race was changed from a handicap to an stakes allowance weight basis and rename to the original name of the event - Honey Fox Stakes.

Records
Speed record: 
1 mile  1:33:18 – Lull (2018)
 miles  1:38.31 – Wend (2016)

Margins: 
 12 lengths – One Fine Lady (1984)

Most wins by a jockey
 7 – Jerry D. Bailey (1990, 1994, 1996, 1997, 1999, 2000, 2004)

Most wins by a trainer
 8 – William I. Mott (1996, 1999, 2000, 2004, 2005, 2006, 2015, 2016)

Winners

Honey Fox (1984–1991)

Legend:

See also
List of American and Canadian Graded races

References

External links
 2020–21 Gulfstream Park Media Guide 

Graded stakes races in the United States
1984 establishments in Florida
Recurring sporting events established in 1984
Horse races in Florida
Flat horse races for four-year-old fillies
Grade 3 stakes races in the United States